Praia Messias Alves is a settlement in Cantagalo District, São Tomé Island in the nation of São Tomé and Príncipe. Its population is 466 (2012 census). It lies on the coast, 1.2 km south of Santana and 0.5 km east of 
Picão Flor.

Population history

References

Populated places in Cantagalo District
Populated coastal places in São Tomé and Príncipe